40 or forty commonly refers to: 
 40 (number)
 The years 40 BC and AD 40

40 or forty may also refer to:

Music
 40 (record producer) (born 1983), Canadian hip hop producer (born Noah Shebib)
 Forty (album), a 2001 live album by Thomas Dolby
 40 (Foreigner album), 2017
 40 (Stray Cats album), 2019
 40 (Sunnyboys album), 2019
 40 (Grupo Niche album), 2020
 40, an album by Peter Morén
 40 (concert video), by the Allman Brothers Band
 "40" (song), by U2
 "40'", a song by Franz Ferdinand from Franz Ferdinand, 2004
 "Forty", a song by Karma to Burn from Almost Heathen, 2001

Other uses
 40 ounce or forty, a bottle of malt liquor
 Forty winks or forty, sleep or nap
 .40 S&W, pistol cartridge
 .40 Super, wildcat pistol cartridge
 (the ASCII character with code 40

See also
 Tessarakonteres (English: Forty), a very large ancient Egyptian galley
 Top 40: a radio format; the current, 40 most-popular songs in the music industry